Adam May may refer to:

 Adam May (television reporter), American reporter
 Adam May (footballer) (born 1997), British footballer
 Adam May (sailor) (born 1976), British Olympic sailor